Hedysarum (sweetvetch) is a genus of the botanical family Fabaceae, consisting of about 200 species of annual or perennial herbs in Asia, Europe, North Africa, and North America.

Description

Species within genus Hedysarum may be herbaceous plants or deciduous shrubs. They have odd-pinnate leaves, with entire leaflets (no notches or indentations). These leaves resemble the leaves of sweet peas. The stipules may be free or connate, and stipels (secondary stipules) are absent.

The inflorescences are peduncled racemes or heads. Bracts are small, with bracteoles below the calyx, and calyx teeth subequal. The petals may be pink, purplish, yellow, or whitish. Vexillum is longer than the wings, with an obtuse keel longer or rarely shorter than the wings. Stamens are diadelphous, 9+1, and anthers uniform. Ovary is 2-8-ovuled. Fruit is a lomentum, with segments that are glabrous, pubescent, bristly, or spiny, and break into single-seeded sections on ripening.

Uses
Hedysarum species are used as food plants by the larvae of some Lepidoptera (moth and butterfly) species including Coleophora accordella. Some species, such as Hedysarum alpinum also known as Alpine sweetvetch or wild potato, were eaten by the Inuit to help ward off the effects of scurvy due to it being rich in vitamin C, containing about 21 mg/100g. 

In his book Into the Wild, Jon Krakauer speculated that Christopher McCandless may have died from eating seeds of H. alpinum, which Krakauer thought might contain swainsonine. This theory was later debunked by experts in the field of botany. Krakauer subsequently postulated that the seeds were stored wet in a plastic bag, which may have created a toxic by-product.

Krakauer was later validated, to a certain extent. Krakauer explains that he came across the research of Ronald Hamilton, who had concluded that the neurotoxin oxalyldiaminopropionic acid (ODAP) in the wild potato seed was responsible for a degenerative disease known as lathyrism. In August 2013, Krakauer sent a modest sample of the seeds for testing, discovering that they contained ".394 per cent beta-ODAP by weight, a concentration well within the levels known to cause lathyrism in humans." Krakauer concludes that "Had McCandless's guidebook to edible plants warned that Hedysarum alpinum seeds contain a neurotoxin that can cause paralysis, he probably would have walked out of the wild in late August with no more difficulty than when he walked into the wild in April, and would still be alive today." Later, a more detailed mass spectrometric analysis showed, that the poison in Hedysarum alpinum is L-canavanine instead of ODAP.

Wildlife
The roots are a major food for grizzly bears.

Species
The following species are accepted by The Plant List:

Hedysarum aculeatum Golosk.
Hedysarum aculeolatum Boiss.
Hedysarum acutifolium Bajtenov
Hedysarum alaicum B.Fedtsch.
Hedysarum algidum L.Z.Shue
Hedysarum alpinum L.
Hedysarum amankutanicum B.Fedtsch.
Hedysarum angrenicum Korotkova
Hedysarum argyreum Greuter & Burdet
Hedysarum argyrophyllum Ledeb.
Hedysarum armenum Boiss. & Tchich.
Hedysarum astragaloides Benth.
Hedysarum atropatanum Boiss.
Hedysarum austrokurilense (N.S.Pavlova) N.S.Pavlova
Hedysarum austrosibiricum B.Fedtsch.
Hedysarum baicalense B.Fedtsch.
Hedysarum balchanense Boriss.
Hedysarum baldshuanicum B.Fedtsch.
Hedysarum bectauatavicum Bajtenov
Hedysarum bellevii (Prain) Bornm.
Hedysarum biebersteinii Zertova
Hedysarum bordzilovskyi Grossh.
Hedysarum boreale Nutt.
Hedysarum boutignyanum (A.Camus) Alleiz.
Hedysarum boveanum Basiner
Hedysarum brachypterum Bunge
Hedysarum brahuicum Boiss.
Hedysarum branthii Trautv. & C.A.Mey.
Hedysarum bucharicum B.Fedtsch.
Hedysarum cachemirianum Baker
Hedysarum callithrix Boiss.
Hedysarum campylocarpon H.Ohashi
Hedysarum candidum M.Bieb.
Hedysarum cappadocicum Boiss.
Hedysarum carnosum Desf.
Hedysarum caucasicum M.Bieb.
Hedysarum chaitocarpum Regel & Schmalh.
Hedysarum chaiyrakanicum Kurbatski
Hedysarum chalchorum N.Ulziykh.
Hedysarum chantavicum Bajtenov
Hedysarum chinense (B.Fedtsch.) Hand.-Mazz.
Hedysarum cisbaicalense Malyschev
Hedysarum cisdarvasicum Kamelin
Hedysarum citrinum Baker f.
Hedysarum consanguineum DC.
Hedysarum coronarium L.
Hedysarum cretaceum DC.
Hedysarum criniferum Boiss.
Hedysarum cumuschtanicum Sultanova
Hedysarum daghestanicum Boiss.
Hedysarum dahuricum B.Fedtsch.
Hedysarum damghanicum Rech.f.
Hedysarum daraut-kurganicum Sultanova
Hedysarum dasycarpum Turcz.
Hedysarum dentatoalatum K.T.Fu
Hedysarum denticulatum Regel & Schmalh.
Hedysarum dmitrievae Bajtenov
Hedysarum drobovii Korotkova
Hedysarum dshambulicum Pavlov
Hedysarum elbursense Bornm. & Gauba
Hedysarum elegans Boiss. & A.Huet
Hedysarum elymaiticum Boiss. & Hausskn.
Hedysarum enaffae Sultanova
Hedysarum falconeri Baker
Hedysarum fallacinum Rech.f. & Aellen
Hedysarum farinosum Parsa
Hedysarum ferganense Korsh.
Hedysarum fistulosum Hand.-Mazz.
Hedysarum flavescens Regel & Schmalh.
Hedysarum flavum Rupr.
Hedysarum flexuosum L.
Hedysarum formosum Basiner
Hedysarum fruticosum Pall.
Hedysarum gmelinii Ledeb.
Hedysarum grandiflorum Pall.
Hedysarum gypsaceum Korotkova
Hedysarum halophilum Bornm. & Gauba
Hedysarum hedysaroides (L.) Schinz & Thell.
Hedysarum hemithamnoides Korotkova
Hedysarum hyrcanum Bornm. & Gauba
Hedysarum ibericum M.Bieb.
Hedysarum iliense B.Fedtsch.
Hedysarum inundatum Turcz.
Hedysarum iomuticum B.Fedtsch.
Hedysarum jaxarticum Popov
Hedysarum jaxartucirdes Y. Liu ex R. Sa
Hedysarum jinchuanense L.Z.Shue
Hedysarum kamcziraki Karimova
Hedysarum kamelinii N.Ulziykh.
Hedysarum kandyktassicum Bajtenov
Hedysarum karataviense B.Fedtsch.
Hedysarum kasteki Bajtenov
Hedysarum kemulariae Sachokia & Chinth.
Hedysarum kirghisorum B.Fedtsch.
Hedysarum kopetdaghi Boriss.
Hedysarum korshinskyanum B.Fedtsch.
Hedysarum kotschyi Boiss.
Hedysarum krasnovii B.Fedtsch.
Hedysarum krylovii Sumnev.
Hedysarum kudrjaschevii Korotkova
Hedysarum kuhitangi Boriss.
Hedysarum kumaonense Baker
Hedysarum latibracteatum N.S.Pavlova
Hedysarum lehmannianum Bunge
Hedysarum leucanthum (Greene) Greene
Hedysarum limitaneum Hand.-Mazz.
Hedysarum linczevskyi Bajtenov
Hedysarum lipskianum L.I.Vassiljeva
Hedysarum lipskyi B.Fedtsch.
Hedysarum longigynophorum C.C.Ni
Hedysarum macedonicum Bornm.
Hedysarum mackenzii Richardson
Hedysarum macranthum Freyn & Sint.
Hedysarum macrocarpum Korotkova
Hedysarum magnificum Kudr.
Hedysarum mahrense Rech.f.
Hedysarum maitlandianum Aitch. & Baker
Hedysarum manaslense (Kitam.) H.Ohashi
Hedysarum membranaceum Coss. & Balansa
Hedysarum microcalyx Baker
Hedysarum micropterum Boiss.
Hedysarum mindshilkense Bajtenov
Hedysarum minjanense Rech.f.
Hedysarum minussinense B.Fedtsch.
Hedysarum mogianicum (B.Fedtsch.) B.Fedtsch.
Hedysarum monophyllum Boriss.
Hedysarum montanum (B.Fedtsch.) B.Fedtsch.
Hedysarum multijugum Maxim.
Hedysarum nagarzense C.C.Ni
Hedysarum narynense Nikitina
Hedysarum naudinianum Coss. & Durieu
Hedysarum neglectum Ledeb.
Hedysarum nikolai Kovalevsk.
Hedysarum nonnae Roskov
Hedysarum nuratense Popov
Hedysarum occidentale Greene
Hedysarum olgae B.Fedtsch.
Hedysarum omissum Korotkova ex Kovalevsk.
Hedysarum ovczinnikovii Karimova
Hedysarum pallidiflorum Pavlov
Hedysarum pallidum Desf.
Hedysarum papillosum Boiss.
Hedysarum parviflorum Bajtenov
Hedysarum parvum Sultanova
Hedysarum pavlovii Bajtenov
Hedysarum perrauderianum Coss. & Durieu
Hedysarum petrovii Yakovlev
Hedysarum plumosum Boiss. & Hausskn.
Hedysarum polybotrys Hand.-Mazz.
Hedysarum popovii Korotkova
Hedysarum praticolum Rech.f.
Hedysarum pseudastragalus Ulbr.
Hedysarum pseudomicrocalyx H.Ohashi & Tateishi
Hedysarum pskemense B.Fedtsch.
Hedysarum pulchrum Nikitina
Hedysarum razoumovianum DC.
Hedysarum renzii Rech.f.
Hedysarum roseum Sims
Hedysarum sachalinense B.Fedtsch.
Hedysarum sajanicum N.Ulziykh.
Hedysarum sangilense Krasnob. & Timokhina
Hedysarum santalaschi B.Fedtsch.
Hedysarum sauzakense Rech.f.
Hedysarum schischkinii Sumnev.
Hedysarum scoparium Fisch. & C.A.Mey.
Hedysarum semenovii Regel & Herder
Hedysarum sericatum Kitam.
Hedysarum sericeum M.Bieb.
Hedysarum setigerum Fisch. & C.A.Mey.
Hedysarum setosum Vved.
Hedysarum severzovii Bunge
Hedysarum sikkimense Baker
Hedysarum singarense Boiss. & Hausskn.
Hedysarum songoricum Bong.
Hedysarum spinosissimum L.
Hedysarum splendens DC.
Hedysarum subglabrum (Kar. & Kir.) B.Fedtsch.
Hedysarum sulphurescens Rydb.
Hedysarum taipeicum (Hand.-Mazz.) K.T.Fu
Hedysarum talassicum Nikitina & Sultanova
Hedysarum tanguticum B.Fedtsch.
Hedysarum taschkendicum Popov
Hedysarum tauricum Willd.
Hedysarum tenuifolium (B.Fedtsch.) B.Fedtsch.
Hedysarum theinum Krasnob.
Hedysarum thiochroum Hand.-Mazz.
Hedysarum tibeticum (Benth.) B.H. Choi & H. Ohashi
Hedysarum trigonomerum Hand.-Mazz.
Hedysarum truncatum Eastw.
Hedysarum turczaninovii Peschkova
Hedysarum turkestanicum Regel & Schmalh.
Hedysarum turkewiczii B.Fedtsch.
Hedysarum ucrainicum Kaschm.
Hedysarum varium Willd.
Hedysarum vicioides Turcz.
Hedysarum volkii Rech.f.
Hedysarum vvedenskyi Korotkova
Hedysarum wakhanicum Podlech & Anderson
Hedysarum wrightianum Aitch. & Baker
Hedysarum xizangensis C.C.Ni
Hedysarum zundukii Peschkova

References

External links

 Global Biodiversity Information Facility entry
 Zipcodezoo entry

Hedysareae
Fabaceae genera